Linse is both a surname and a given name. Notable people with the name include:

Surname:
Cornelia Linse (born 1959), German rower
Katrin Linse, German marine biologist
Pat Linse, American illustrator and skeptic

Given name:
Linse Kessler (born 1966), Danish adult model, actress and businesswoman

See also

Lins (disambiguation)

German-language surnames